Phyllomedusa boliviana is a species of frog in the subfamily Phyllomedusinae. It is found in Argentina, Bolivia, and Brazil (west of Mato Grosso and Rondônia States).
Its natural habitats are subtropical or tropical moist lowland forests, subtropical or tropical moist montane forests, intermittent freshwater marshes, and ponds. It is threatened by habitat loss.

References

Phyllomedusa
Amphibians described in 1902
Taxonomy articles created by Polbot